Majesty Crush was an American indie rock band which belonged to the shoegazing genre popularized in the UK in the late 1980s and early 1990s. Hailing from Detroit, Michigan, Majesty Crush formed in 1990 and broke up in 1995. The band's lineup consisted of lead singer David Stroughter (1966-2017), bassist Hobey Echlin, guitarist Michael Segal and drummer Odell Nails III.

History
Majesty Crush served as the opening act at shows in the early 1990s for such bands as Jesus Jones, Mazzy Star, Royal Trux, and The Verve. The song "No. 1 Fan" picked up significant radio airplay on Windsor, Ontario's 89X, and led to Majesty Crush signing with Dali Records, a Warner/Elektra subsidiary. The label released Love 15, the band's lone studio album, in 1993. 
AllMusic's Joshua Glazer described the album as "a testament to what might have been, if only the band's four members lived in Manchester instead of Detroit." 
The band's momentum came to an abrupt halt, however, when Dali folded within a month of the album's release. 
Majesty Crush returned a year later with the self-released Sans Muscles EP before breaking up in 1995. 
David Stroughter went on to form the band P.S. I Love You.

In 2009, Full Effect Records released the compilation album I Love You in Other Cities: The Best of Majesty Crush 1990–1995. OC Weeklys Dave Segal remarked that the album "offers 14 reasons why we should still care about this footnote in shoegaze-rock history." AllMusic's Heather Phares called it "a good retrospective of a band that just may have been in the wrong place at the wrong time." Laura Witkowski of Metro Times said the album "feels like the work of a superfan, one keen to share his excitement for a band deserving of more attention than it received."

Musical style and lyrical content
While incorporating the same lush, dreamy sound as other shoegazing acts of the time, it was the lyrics of Majesty Crush songs that set them apart from other artists of the genre. Stroughter's often strange and obsessive lyrics cover such subjects as stalking Jodie Foster ("No. 1 Fan"), torture ("Boyfriend"), heroin ("Horse"), a female cashier at an adult book store ("Sunny Pie"), actresses ("Uma"), tennis stars ("Seles") and Italian porn stars ("Cicciolina").

Discography

Studio album

Compilation album

EPs and singles

References

External links
Majesty Crush on Myspace

Dream pop musical groups
Indie rock musical groups from Michigan
Musical groups established in 1990
Musical groups disestablished in 1995
Musical groups from Detroit
American shoegaze musical groups
1990 establishments in Michigan